Gökçek Vederson (born Wederson Luiz da Silva Medeiros; 22 July 1981) is a Brazilian retired footballer who played as a left-back.

Career
Born Rio de Janeiro state, Wederson has played for Internacional, Americano, Vasco da Gama, Juventude and Ituano. He left for Turkey in August 2004.

He signed a 3-year contract with Fenerbahçe on 11 June 2007.

Citizenship
Vederson holds dual-citizenship with Brazil and Turkey. The latter he received in March 2007. Having not been capped by the Brazil national football team, Brazilian Football Federation (CFB), respectively, Vederson has the option of playing for Turkey, if called up.

References

External links
 
 
 Profile at CBF 
 
 
 
 

1981 births
Living people
People from Campos dos Goytacazes
Brazilian footballers
Turkish footballers
Sport Club Internacional players
Americano Futebol Clube players
CR Vasco da Gama players
Esporte Clube Juventude players
Ituano FC players
Ankaraspor footballers
Fenerbahçe S.K. footballers
Bursaspor footballers
Antalyaspor footballers
Adana Demirspor footballers
Süper Lig players
Naturalized citizens of Turkey
Brazilian emigrants to Turkey
Turkish people of Brazilian descent
Association football defenders
Sportspeople from Rio de Janeiro (state)
Converts to Islam